Dearden is a patronymic and an English family name meaning "the valley of the deer" deriving from the location, Dearden, near Edenfield, Lancashire.

People with the surname
Barry Dearden, also known as Barry Deardon (born 1963), Canadian international soccer player 
Basil Dearden (1911–1971), English film director
Bill Dearden (b. 1944), English athlete and manager in football
Dick Dearden (1938–2019), United States political figure from Iowa
Harry Dearden (born 1997), English cricketer
James Dearden (b. 1949), English film director and screenwriter
John Dearden (1891–1972), English-born Irish athlete in cricket
John Francis Dearden (1907–1988), United States prelate and cardinal in the Roman Catholic Church
Kevin Dearden (b. 1970), English athlete in football
Lorraine Dearden (b. 1961), Australo-British economist
Stephen Dearden (b. 1968), English athlete in cricket
Stuart Dearden (b. 1990), Scottish athlete in football
Taylor Dearden (born 1993), American actress
Thomas Dearden (born 2001), Australian professional rugby league footballer 
Venetia Dearden (born 1975), British photographer and filmmaker
Nicholas Dearden (born 1960) British Product Designer and inventor of the Expanding Capstan Table

See also
Duerden
Durden

References